In multilinear algebra, a reshaping of tensors is any bijection between the set of indices of an order- tensor and the set of indices of an order- tensor, where .  The use of indices presupposes tensors in coordinate representation with respect to a basis.  The coordinate representation of a tensor can be regarded as a multi-dimensional array, and a bijection from one set of indices to another therefore amounts to a rearrangement of the array elements into an array of a different shape.  Such a rearrangement constitutes a particular kind of linear map between the vector space of order- tensors and the vector space of order- tensors.

Definition 
Given a positive integer , the notation  refers to the set  of the first  positive integers.

For each integer  where  for a positive integer , let Vk denote an nk-dimensional vector space over a field . Then there are vector space isomorphisms (linear maps)

Via these (and other) vector space isomorphisms, a tensor can be interpreted in several ways as an order- tensor where .

Coordinate representation 
The first vector space isomorphism on the list above, gives the coordinate representation of an abstract tensor. Assume that each of the  vector spaces  has a basis . This can be regarded as a d-dimensional array whose elements are the coefficients .

Vectorization 
This is known as vectorization, and is analogous to vectorization of matrices. A standard choice of bijection  is such that 

which is consistent with the way in which the colon operator in Matlab and GNU Octave reshapes a higher-order tensor into a vector.

General flattenings 
In the grouping,

there are  groups with  factors in the  group (where  and ).

Letting  for each  satisfying , an -flattening of a tensor , denoted , is obtained by applying the two processes above within each of the  groups of factors. That is, the coordinate representation of the  group of factors is obtained using the isomorphism , which requires specifying bases for all of the vector spaces .

Matricization  
Let  be the coordinate representation of an abstract tensor with respect to a basis.
Usually, a standard flattening is denoted by 

 

These reshapings are sometimes called matricizations or unfoldings in the literature. A standard choice for the bijections  is the one that is consistent with the reshape function in Matlab and GNU Octave, namely

 

Tensors
Multilinear algebra